Heartbeat Productions is the parent company of a number of record labels originating from Bristol, England. Heartbeat Records was formed in 1978, and other labels have been added over the years to cater for specific niche markets or bands: Riot City Records in 1980, Disorder Records in 1981, FSA Records in 1992 and Trash City Records in 1994.

Heartbeat Records
Heartbeat Records was started in 1978 as a partnership of local musician Simon Edwards and Tony Dodd of Tony's Record Shop. Simon Edwards recorded and produced the first single, "I don't want my heart to rule my head" by Social Security, after which Tony Dodd decided to concentrate on his shop and Simon Edwards took over sole control. The label's second single, Europeans by Europeans, caught the attention of Iain McNay of Cherry Red and they signed a marketing agreement with Heartbeat. The next release was the 12-inch EP, "This Is Your Life", from the influential Glaxo Babies, recorded at Crescent Studios in Bath. A number of other singles were released, however to accommodate the large number of bands around at the time they brought out the seminal "Avon Calling" – The Bristol Compilation LP. Four further LPs were released: 2 by the Glaxo Babies, The Transmitters and Art Objects (later to become Blue Aeroplanes) before the label became inactive in 1984. It was revived with the 1997 album release of a 1967 long lost live radio recording (from Stockholm, Sweden) by American 1960s psych band The Electric Prunes.

Cherry Red in recent years has repackaged tracks and albums from the Heartbeat back catalogue, including previously unreleased songs from the Glaxo Babies, Art Objects and The X-Certs.

Riot City Records

Simon Edwards was looking to release records by local punk band Vice Squad, however Cherry Red were not enthusiastic, so with Dave Bateman and Shane Baldwin from the band he set up Riot City Records (they had chosen the name, as Bristol had recently been in the news due to the 1980 St. Pauls riot). The label was intended to release music from a new generation of punk bands that were forming, and it had been Vice Squad's intention to actively select the ones who would record for the label, however due to touring commitments they did not have the time and Simon Edwards soon took over.

In 1982, an American punk compilation album, Hell Comes to Your House (Reagan 1) was licensed from Bemisbrain Records USA, and issued on the subsidiary Riot State Records label. In 1985 Chaotic Dischord released the spoof NOW! album, "NOW! That's What I Call A Fuckin' Racket (Vol 1)" (GRR 1) on another subsidiary, Not Very Nice Records.

In its relatively short lifespan the label had over 40 releases, selling nearly 250,000 records and was one of the prominent exponents of British punk music, regularly having hits in the UK Indie Chart.

Disorder Records
The hardcore noise band Disorder originally formed in Bristol in 1980. After Riot City Records declined to sign them, the band launched their own label Disorder Records in 1981, with Heartbeat Records and Riot City boss Simon Edwards. Over a period of three years they released three 7-inch EP's and one 12-inch EP, before moving on to local anarchist label Children of the Revolution Records (COR). A final 12-inch EP, The Singles Collection, was released in 1984.

Disorder releases

FSA Records
Set up in 1992 for the recently formed Bristol band Flying Saucer Attack. Their first single in 1992 had several limited editions, each with part homemade sleeves of differing designs. The first album in 1993 was self-titled, but is sometimes referred to as Rural Psychedelia. Vinyl releases were the preference of the band and the records tended to sell out quickly, due to their cult status. After their third single in 1994 the band joined Domino Records, however, in 1999 they returned to FSA Records issuing the LP "Mirror", before finally disbanding.

FSA releases

Trash City Records
Trash City was primarily set up in 1994 to issue 7-inch singles by US garage bands. It only released one record in its first year and it was not until 1996 and the signing of UK band Headcase, that the label issued another record. Three more singles and two albums were to eventually follow.

Trash City releases

Reissues on other labels
Bristol Archive Records are currently providing some of the Heartbeat Records back catalogue tracks for download, through the usual outlets (Amazon, iTunes, etc.).

See also
 List of Bands from Bristol
 Culture of Bristol
 Avon Calling
 Bristol Archive Records
 the Cartel
 List of record labels
 List of Record Labels from Bristol
 Bristol Record Labels

References

External links
 Heartbeat Productions
 Heartbeat Records at Discogs.com
 Listen to Avon Calling (2005) at last.fm
 Heartbeat Records: Avon Calling
 Heartbeat Records story on YouTube
 Riot City Records story on YouTube
 [ Review of Art Objects album Bagpipe Music from Allmusic]
 FSA Records at Discogs.com
 Heartbeat Records at Bristol Archive Records
 Riot City Records at Bristol Archive Records

Record labels established in 1978
Record labels disestablished in 1984
Record labels established in 1997
Re-established companies
British independent record labels
Indie rock record labels
Music in Bristol